Cecil Butler may refer to:
 Cecil Butler (baseball), American Major League Baseball pitcher
 Cecil Butler (architect), English architect
 Cecil Arthur Butler, Australian businessman